Bryant Army Airport , also known historically as Bryant Army Airfield, is a U.S. Army Airfield located at Fort Richardson, near the city of Anchorage in the U.S. state of Alaska. 

It has one runway designated 17/35 with a 4,086 x 100 ft (1,273 x 30 m) asphalt surface.

References

External links
 FAA Alaska airport diagram (GIF)

Airports in Anchorage, Alaska
Military in Anchorage, Alaska
United States Army airfields